The Kanaka Shree is an award instituted by the Government of Karnataka to recognize and honour individuals who contribute to the promotion of the values and literature of Kanakadasa.

The Award
The award carries a citation, a shawl  and a cash prize 500,000 Indian rupees.

Winners
 2015: Dr. Swamirao Kulkarni
 2014: Prof. A V Navada
 2013: Prof. Krishna Kolhar Kulkarni
 2011: Prof. Jyothi Hosur 
 2010: Dr. H. J. Lakkappa Gowda 
 2009: Dr. T. N. Nagarathna
 2008: Prof. Sudhakar

References

Civil awards and decorations of Karnataka